is one of the 16 wards of Nagoya, Japan. As of October 1, 2019, the ward has an estimated population of 135,134 and a population density of 8,290 persons per km². The total area is 16.30 km².

History
Nakamura Ward is famous as the birthplace of Toyotomi Hideyoshi.

One of the merchant areas is called Funairi-chō, which is close to the Hori Canal. The area was heavily damaged during the bombing of Nagoya in World War II. One of the houses that was saved from there is the Tōmatsu House.

Places

JR Nagoya Station, Meitetsu Nagoya Station and Kintetsu Nagoya Station are all located next to each other in the ward's Meieki district. Adjoining these train stations are several department stores, including Matsuzakaya, the Meitetsu Department Store and Kintetsu Pass'e.

To the west of the station is Nagoya's only Islamic house of worship, the Nagoya Mosque, which was established in 1998.

Economy

The Central Japan Railway Company has its headquarters in the JR Central Towers in Meieki. Aoki's Pizza has its headquarters in Nakamura-ku. DMG Mori Seiki has its headquarters in Nakamura-ku.

Air France has an office in the Nagoya-Daiya Building in Nakamura-ku.
Sub CBD
Sasashima-raibu 24
Chūkyō Television Broadcasting
Global Gate
Japan International Cooperation Agency Chūbu（JICA Chūbu）
Market Square Sasashima
Zepp Nagoya

Education

There are 3 universities in the ward.
Aichi University Nagoya campus
Doho University
Nagoya College of Music

The ward also has a North Korean primary school, Nagoya Corean Elementary School & Kindergarten (名古屋朝鮮初級学校).

People
Famous people born in Nakamura Ward include:
 Toyotomi Hideyoshi, Samurai
 Katō Kiyomasa, Samurai
 Kiyoseumi Takayuki, Sumo wrestler
 Hiroshi Tamaki, actor
 Mariya Yamada, actress
 Shoichi Kondo, politician

Gallery

References

External links

 Nagoya Mosque